Korlu is a village in the Yayladere District, Bingöl Province, Turkey. The village is populated by Kurds of the Lertik tribe and had a population of 96 in 2021.

The hamlets of Düğünlü, Eyüphan, Göl, Hacıkomu, Halkalı, İbiş, Kurtuluş, Kuşçular, Ocaklı, Taşlık and Yakalı are attached to the village.

References 

Villages in Yayladere District
Kurdish settlements in Bingöl Province